There are many different keratin proteins normally expressed in the human integumentary system.

See also 
 List of cutaneous conditions caused by mutations in keratins
 List of target antigens in pemphigoid
 List of target antigens in pemphigus
 Cutaneous conditions with immunofluorescence findings
 List of cutaneous conditions
 List of genes mutated in cutaneous conditions
 List of histologic stains that aid in diagnosis of cutaneous conditions

References 

 
 

Dermatology-related lists